Bénédicte Cronier is a French bridge player.

Cronier was born in 1961.

Bridge accomplishments

Wins

 Venice Cup (2) 2005, 2011 
 North American Bridge Championships (6)
 Freeman Mixed Board-a-Match (1) 2015 
 Machlin Women's Swiss Teams (1) 2011 
 Sternberg Women's Board-a-Match Teams (3) 2009, 2010, 2013 
 Wagar Women's Knockout Teams (1) 2011

Runners-up

 Venice Cup (2) 1987, 2001 
 North American Bridge Championships (3)
 Sternberg Women's Board-a-Match Teams (1) 2012 
 Wagar Women's Knockout Teams (2) 2012, 2013

References

External links
 
 

French contract bridge players
Venice Cup players
Living people
Year of birth missing (living people)